Gary Wayne Hall Jr. (born September 26, 1974) is an American former competition swimmer who represented the United States at the 1996, 2000, and 2004 Olympics and won ten Olympic medals (five gold, three silver, two bronze).  He is a former world record-holder in two relay events.  Hall is well known for his "pro-wrestling like" antics before a competition; frequently strutting onto the pool deck in boxing shorts and robe, shadow boxing and flexing for the audience.

Family
His father, Gary Hall Sr., also competed in three Olympics as a swimmer (1968, 1972, and 1976).  His maternal uncle, Charles Keating III, swam in the 1976 Olympics, and his maternal grandfather, Charles Keating Jr., was a national swimming champion in the 1940s.

Career

1996 Atlanta games
In his first Olympics at the age of 21 in Atlanta, Hall had only 6 years of swimming experience yet he already had a well-known rivalry with Russia's Alexander Popov.  Hall and his teammates dominated the relay events, but Popov beat Hall and dominated in the individual events.

Hall won two individual silvers and two team relay golds at the games, including helping set the world record in both the 400 m freestyle and medley relays.

1996–2000
In 1998, Hall was suspended by International Swimming Federation (FINA) for marijuana use.

In 1999, he was diagnosed with Type 1 diabetes, commonly referred to as childhood or juvenile diabetes. Upon his diagnosis, Hall struggled with the possibilities and the effects he knew the medical condition would have on his life. He took a short hiatus from swimming, but returned to compete in the 2000 U.S. Olympic Trials. There he won the 50 m freestyle and placed second in the 100 m freestyle. His 50 m time of 21.76 seconds set a new American record, beating the ten-year-old record set by Tom Jager.

2000 Sydney games
Hall's success continued in the 2000 Summer Olympics held in Sydney, Australia. He won the gold medal in the individual 50 m freestyle, tying with his fellow U.S. Team member Anthony Ervin, and won the gold and silver in the team relays. He also won a bronze in the individual 100-meter freestyle race.

Prior to the 4 × 100 m freestyle relay, Hall posted on his blog: "My biased opinion says that we will smash them (Australia's 4 × 100 m team) like guitars. Historically the U.S. has always risen to the occasion. But the logic in that remote area of my brain says it won't be so easy for the United States to dominate the waters this time."

Hall swam the last leg in the relay, against Australian Ian Thorpe. Hall had a better start and came up a half body-length in front of Thorpe. Hall led the first length and was 0.23 seconds ahead at the turn but Thorpe fought back, and with 15 meters to go both swimmers were even; Thorpe finished first by a hand-length, inflicting the United States' first-ever Olympic defeat in the event. The Australian team responded to Hall's remarks after the race by playing air guitar on the pool deck. Hall recalled the race, saying, "I don't even know how to play the guitar...I consider it the best relay race I've ever been part of. I doff my cap to the great Ian Thorpe. He had a better finish than I had." Another member of Australia's victorious 4 × 100 team, Michael Klim, recalled that "Hall was the first swimmer to come over and congratulate us. Even though he dished it out, he was a true sportsman." The decisive moment in the relay race had been Klim's opening leg where he set a new 100-meter world record of 48.18, gaining a 0.71-second advantage over Anthony Ervin, a lead which his Australian teammates successfully defended. Hall clocked a faster 100 meters than Thorpe (48.24 to 48.30), but got out-touched to the wall by Thorpe (who earlier in the night set a new world record to win gold in the 400 meter freestyle).

2004 Athens games
At the 2004 Summer Olympics, Hall again won the gold medal in 50 m freestyle.  At 29, he became the oldest American male Olympic swimmer since Duke Kahanamoku competed at age 34 in 1924. Despite having swum the fastest 50 in the year leading up to the 2004 Games, he was regarded as a long-shot to medal in the 50 m freestyle. He also won a bronze medal for competing in the preliminary heat of the 4 × 100-meter freestyle relay.

2008 Olympic trials
On July 5, 2008, Hall failed to qualify for the 2008 Olympic team after finishing fourth in the 50-meter finals at the US Olympic Trials in Omaha, Nebraska.

The Race Club
The Race Club is a swimming club founded by Hall and his father, Gary Hall Sr. The club, originally known as "The World Team," was designed to serve as a training group for elite swimmers across the world in preparation for the 2000 Sydney Olympic Games. To be able to train with the Race Club, one must either have been ranked in the top 20 in the world the past 3 calendar years or top 3 in their nation in the past year. The Race Club included such well known swimmers as Roland Mark Schoeman, Mark Foster, Ryk Neethling, Ricky Busquet and Therese Alshammar. They were coached by University of Michigan coach Mike Bottom.

The Race Club offers various swimming camps, swim clinics, and swimming technique video recording year round for young swimmers at their Islamorada, Florida-based training center.

Shark attack
In the summer of 2006, Hall's sister, Bebe Hall, was attacked by a blacktip reef shark near Islamorada, while she and Gary were spearfishing, an attack for which Bebe Hall needed 19 stitches. Gary Hall repeatedly punched the shark and his sister shot a spear into it, after which the shark swam off.

Personality
Hall has long been one of competitive swimming's most colorful personalities. He often shadow-boxes before a race and is known for wearing a boxing robe in lieu of the usual warm-ups. The robe even earned Hall a fine during the 2004 Olympics, as the Everlast-made apparel broke the uniform supplying deal the team had  with Speedo. His eccentricity has won him a great deal of fans, but what some perceive to be "showboating" has drawn substantial criticism.  He is also an outspoken critic of performance-enhancing drug use in swimming, and is one of the few prominent swimmers willing to publicly question the legitimacy of suspected individual accomplishments.  In 2008, he compared International Swimming Hall of Fame inductee Amy Van Dyken to disgraced track & field athlete Marion Jones, noting they were both clients of the Bay Area Laboratory Co-Operative (BALCO).

Additional honors
Former American record holder in the 50-meter freestyle.
Humanitarian Award winner at 2004 Golden Goggle Awards.
On April 30, 2012, it was announced that Gary Hall Jr. would be inducted into the U.S. Olympic Hall of Fame in July 2012.

See also

 List of multiple Summer Olympic medalists
 List of multiple Olympic gold medalists
 List of multiple Olympic medalists at a single Games
 List of Olympic medalists in swimming (men)
 List of University of Texas at Austin alumni
 List of World Aquatics Championships medalists in swimming (men)
 World record progression 4 × 100 metres freestyle relay
 World record progression 4 × 100 metres medley relay

References

External links
 
 
 
 
 
 Gary Hall Jr. at the International Swimming Hall of Fame
 
 

1974 births
Living people
American male freestyle swimmers
American male medley swimmers
World record setters in swimming
Medalists at the 2004 Summer Olympics
Medalists at the 1996 Summer Olympics
Medalists at the 2000 Summer Olympics
Olympic bronze medalists for the United States in swimming
Olympic gold medalists for the United States in swimming
Olympic silver medalists for the United States in swimming
Swimmers from Cincinnati
Swimmers at the 1995 Pan American Games
Swimmers at the 1996 Summer Olympics
Swimmers at the 2000 Summer Olympics
Swimmers at the 2003 Pan American Games
Swimmers at the 2004 Summer Olympics
Texas Longhorns men's swimmers
World Aquatics Championships medalists in swimming
Keating family
Pan American Games gold medalists for the United States
Pan American Games silver medalists for the United States
Pan American Games medalists in swimming
People with type 1 diabetes
Goodwill Games medalists in swimming
Competitors at the 2001 Goodwill Games
Medalists at the 1995 Pan American Games
Medalists at the 2003 Pan American Games
20th-century American people
21st-century American people